is a tram stop in Ukyo-ku, Kyoto, Japan.

Station layout 
The station consists of two split-platforms at ground level.

Adjacent stations

References

External links 
 
 

Stations of Keifuku Electric Railroad
Railway stations in Japan opened in 1925